Vetronics, a portmanteau of vehicle and electronics, is a technological designation used extensively in the military domain. The term also has limited usage in other contexts and in company branding, particularly in the veterinary and medical domains. It is the vehicular equivalent of avionics.

References

External links
 MilCAN Working Group
 U.S. Army Vetronics Institute
 Vetronics Research Centre (VRC), University of Brighton, UK
 Vehicle Systems Integration (VSI), UK MoD-funded Applied Research Programme
 Military Vetronics Association

Military vehicles